Dharanidhar Das  (born April 1919) was an Indian politician. He was elected to the Lok Sabha the lower house of the Indian Parliament from the Mangaldoi constituency of Assam  as a member of the Indian National Congress.

References

External links
 Official Biographical Sketch in Lok Sabha Website

1919 births
Possibly living people
Indian National Congress politicians
India MPs 1971–1977
Lok Sabha members from Assam
Indian National Congress politicians from Assam